Aganope thyrsiflora is a liana which shows the characters of a shrub when small. It is found in most of the tropical Asian countries.

References

External links 
 

Millettieae